The Mbulu white-eye (Zosterops mbuluensis) is a bird species in the family Zosteropidae. It is found in southern Kenya and northern Tanzania.

The Mbulu white-eye was formerly treated as a subspecies of the montane white-eye (Zosterops poliogastrus). When a molecular phylogenetic study published in 2014 found that it was more closely related to the Abyssinian white-eye (Zosterops abyssinicus), the Mbulu white-eye was promoted to species rank. It is monotypic.

References

Mbulu white-eye
Fauna of Kenya
Fauna of Tanzania
Mbulu white-eye
Mbulu white-eye